The Whisper Market is a 1920 American silent drama film directed by George L. Sargent and starring Corinne Griffith, George MacQuarrie and Eulalie Jensen.

Cast
 Corinne Griffith as 	Erminie North
 George Howard as 	Basil North
 George MacQuarrie as 	Burke
 James O'Neill as 	Hobson
 Eulalie Jensen as Juliet Saltmarsh
 Howard Truesdale as 	George Saltmarsh
 Jacob Kingsbury as 	Doucer

References

Bibliography
 Connelly, Robert B. The Silents: Silent Feature Films, 1910-36, Volume 40, Issue 2. December Press, 1998.
 Munden, Kenneth White. The American Film Institute Catalog of Motion Pictures Produced in the United States, Part 1. University of California Press, 1997.

External links
 

1920 films
1920 drama films
1920s English-language films
American silent feature films
Silent American drama films
American black-and-white films
Films directed by George L. Sargent
Vitagraph Studios films
1920s American films